David Pérez may refer to:
Davide Perez (1711–1778), Italian composer
David Pérez (footballer) (born 1990), Colombian footballer
David Pérez García, Spanish politician
David Pérez, singer in C-Note
David Arteaga (born 1981), Spanish footballer
David Pérez Sanz (born 1994), Spanish tennis player
David Perez (politician) (born 1990), Swedish politician